Midland Motor Company was an American brass era automobile manufacturer in Moline, Illinois from 1908 to 1913.

History 
Midland Motor Company formed from the remnants of the Deere-Clark Motor Car Company after the John Deere company pulled out of the venture.

In 1910, Midland produced  two models. The Model L was a touring car with a 318in3 (5213cc) (4×5-inch, 114×127 mm) four-cylinder engine of 40 hp (30 kW) built by Milwaukee. It had a wheelbase of 115 in (2921 mm), 34×4-inch (86×10-cm) spoke wheels, and the choice of partial tonneau or roadster with trunk. In 1911 this was mid-priced at $2,100.

The Model K was a touring car with a 390in3 (6389cc) (4×5-inch, 120×140 mm) four of 50 hp (37 kW). It had a wheelbase of 118 in (2997 mm), 36×4-inch (91×10-cm) spoke wheels, and the choice of touring or demi-tonneau bodies. In 1911 this was higher mid-priced at $2,250

Midland had progressive engineering, with an in-unit engine and transmission. The drive-line from the engine to the differential was enclosed. A six-cylinder car was introduced in 1912.

In 1911 Charles Pope retired and died the next year. The company entered bankruptcy in 1913 due to mismanagement.

See also
List of defunct United States automobile manufacturers
Velie and Moline, are other early automobile manufacturers from Moline, Illinois.
1911 Midland Model L-1 at Conceptcarz

References

Motor vehicle manufacturers based in Illinois
Defunct motor vehicle manufacturers of the United States
History of Illinois
Moline, Illinois
Defunct companies based in Illinois
1900s cars
1910s cars
Brass Era vehicles
Cars introduced in 1908
Vehicle manufacturing companies established in 1908
Vehicle manufacturing companies disestablished in 1913